Lewinella xylanilytica  is a Gram-negative, rod-shaped, aerobic and non-motile bacterium from the genus of Lewinella which has been isolated from coastal seawater from Marado on the Jeju Island on Korea.

References

External links
Type strain of Lewinella xylanilytica at BacDive -  the Bacterial Diversity Metadatabase	

Bacteroidota
Bacteria described in 2015